Property management is the operation, control, maintenance, and oversight of real estate and physical property. This can include residential, commercial, and land real estate. Management indicates the need for real estate to be cared for and monitored, with accountability for and attention to its useful life and condition. This is much akin to the role of management in any business.

Property management is the management of personal property, equipment, tooling, and physical capital assets acquired and used to build, repair, and maintain end item deliverables. Property management involves the processes, systems, and workforce required to manage the life cycle of all acquired property as defined above, including acquisition, control, accountability, responsibility, maintenance, utilization, and disposition.

An owner of a single-family home, condominium, or multi-family building may engage the services of a professional property management company. The company will then advertise the rental property, handle tenant inquiries, screen applicants, select suitable candidates, draw up a lease agreement, conduct a move-in inspection, move the tenant(s) into the property and collect rental income. The company will then coordinate any maintenance issues, supply the owner(s) with financial statements and any relevant information regarding the property, etc.

Roles 

This profession has many facets, including managing the accounts and finances of real estate properties and participating in or initiating litigation with tenants, contractors, and insurance agencies. Litigation is sometimes considered a separate function set aside for trained attorneys. Although a person will be responsible for this in their job description, there may be an attorney working under a property manager. Special attention is given to landlord/tenant law; most commonly, evictions, non-payment, harassment, reduction of pre-arranged services, and public nuisance are legal subjects that gain the most attention from property managers. Therefore, it is a necessity that a property manager is current with applicable municipal, county, state, and Federal Fair Housing laws and practices.

Licensing

Australia 
Every state of Australia except South Australia require a proper license in order to manage a property. The purpose of this regulation is to ensure that a property manager is as well-prepared for the job as possible. (There may be exceptions like managing an extremely small property for a relative.) In South Australia, if you run a property management business, you must be a registered land agent.

All tenancy applications received are reference checked inclusive of identification, means of income, previous tenancy references and workplace references. Additionally tenants are checked against the National Tenancy Information Centre of Australia which records details of defaulting tenants.. In recent year property management in Australia has changed from a brick and mortar business to virtual online.

Canada 
In Canada, the laws governing property management and landlord/tenant relations are, generally speaking, a Provincial responsibility. Each Province and Territory makes its own laws on these matters. In most cases, any person or company can offer property management services, and there are licensing requirements. Other than specific laws in each Province and Territory governing these matters, they are governed by English Common Law, except in the Province of Quebec where the Civil Code is used in place of English Common Law. In some cities, the Provincial Legislation is supplemented by City by-laws.

British Columbia 
The licensing of property managers is regulated by the provincial government and licensing by the BC Real Estate Council (RECBC).
The Real Estate Council of British Columbia is a regulatory agency established by the provincial government in 1958. Its mandate is to protect the public interest by enforcing the licensing and licensee conduct requirements of the Real Estate Services Act. The Council is responsible for licensing individuals and brokerages engaged in real estate sales, rental and strata property management. The Council also enforces entry qualifications, investigates complaints against licensees and imposes disciplinary sanctions under the Act.

The Council is responsible for ensuring that the interests of consumers who use the services of real estate licensees are adequately protected against wrongful actions by the licensees. A wrongful action may be deliberate or may be the consequence of inadequate exercise of reasonable judgment by a licensee in carrying out their duties and responsibilities.

The Council is responsible for determining what is appropriate education in real estate matters for individuals seeking to be licensed as real estate practitioners and arranging for licensing courses and examinations as part of the qualification requirement for licensing. Under the authority of the Council, licensing courses are delivered by the UBC Sauder School of Business, Real Estate Division.

Ontario  
In Ontario, no licensing is required to operate, however ACMO – the Association of Condo Managers of Ontario is a self-governing body for certification and designation of its members who run buildings with more than 600 units. (RECO) the Real Estate Council of Ontario, regulates licensed realtors in Ontario. The provincial government is revising its condominium act. After public consultation, it hopes to put forth legislation during the 2015–2016 session requiring Condo Management firms and staff or condo employees and boards to be accredited.

Saskatchewan and Alberta  
Both require property managers to hold a real estate license.

Germany 
In Germany, property management is divided into the areas of home owner‘s association management (WEG-Verwaltung), rental management (Mietverwaltung), and special property management (Sondereigentumsverwaltung) with different clients and tasks. Since 2018, a license in accordance with the Trade Regulation Act (§ 34 C GewO) is mandatory for property managers. This requires sufficient insurance as well as sound financial circumstances and reliability. There are no requirements regarding professional trainings or degrees. However, there is a training obligation of twenty hours within a period of three years. Receiving a license as a property manager in Germany is accompanied by membership of the relevant chamber of industry and commerce.

Hong Kong 
In Hong Kong, property management companies (PMCs) and property management practitioners (PMPs) are regulated under the Property Management Services Ordinance (PMSO) (Chapter 626 of the Laws of Hong Kong), which was enacted in 2016. Only some sections under the PMSO have commenced operation and they are the ones concerning the establishment of the Property Management Services Authority (PMSA) as the regulator for the industry. Apart from establishing the PMSA, the PMSO provides a legal framework for the regulatory regime, and the details of the regime, including the licensing criteria for PMCs and PMPs, are being formulated by the PMSA (public consultation underway) and will be set out in subsidiary legislation. Other sections of the PMSO will commence operation after the subsidiary legislation is passed by the Legislative Council of Hong Kong and commences operation.

Certain classes of persons are exempted from the licensing requirement. Those not exempted are required to obtain a licence and failure to do so is a criminal offence subject to a maximum penalty of a fine of HK$500,000 and imprisonment for two years.  Those who are licensed are subject to disciplinary actions (including verbal warning, written reprimand, penalty up to HK$300,000, imposition of a condition on licence, suspension and revocation of licences) by the PMSA if they commit a "disciplinary offence" as defined under section 4 of the PMSO. The PMSA may issue codes of conduct containing practical guidance to licensees, including the matters that the PMSA considers to be relevant to determining whether a licensee has committed a disciplinary offence.

Under the PMSO, property management services (PMSs) are to be prescribed under seven specified categories as follows:
 General management services relating to a property;
 Management of the environment of a property;
 Repair, maintenance and improvement of a property;
 Finance and asset management relating to a property;
 Facility management relating to a property;
 Human resources management relating to personnel involved in the management of a property; and
 Legal services relating to the management of a property.

Only those PMCs providing PMSs falling within more than one category of PMSs are required to be licensed, and individuals who assume a managerial or supervisory role in these PMCs are also required to be licensed. In other words, PMCs providing PMSs falling within only one category of PMSs are not required to be licensed, and individuals working in the front line without assuming a managerial or supervisory role are not required to be licensed either. All types of properties (i.e. whether residential, commercial or otherwise) are covered by the PMSO, but "property" is given a technical meaning and refers to those which have a deed of mutual covenant (DMC) (a document containing terms that are binding on all flat owners of a multi-unit or multi-storey building) since only PMSs provided to buildings with multi-ownership are intended to be regulated. In other words, PMCs and PMPs providing PMSs to properties without a DMC are not to be regulated under the PMSO.

India 
In India, there is no statutory regulation of property management companies, real estate agents or developers. In 2013, a Real Estate Regulation and Development Bill was passed by the Union Cabinet, but has yet to take effect. The bill seeks to set up 3 regulatory bodies in the country. The Real Estate Regulation and Development Bill was passed by the Union Cabinet in early 2016 and this is expected to bring about a sea change in the management of real estate in India.

New Zealand 
Commercial Property Management leasing agents in New Zealand are required to have a real estate agents licence and operate and audited trust bank account. Commercial leases are covered by the Property Law Act 1952.

Residential property management in New Zealand is an unlicensed and unregulated industry. Property managers in New Zealand do not require any registration, minimum knowledge or skill. The New Zealand Government reviewed whether all forms of property management need any legislation. Following completion of the review, the Associate Minister of Justice, Hon Nathan Guy, announced on 2 July 2009 that no new occupational regulation would be imposed on property managers in part due to there already being existing laws which could be used to protect consumers.

New Zealand licensed Real Estate Agents may offer Residential Property Management service with qualified Real Estate Agents as Property Managers, or property manager's working under the Licensed Real estate agency. Member Agents are supposed to adhere to the Real Estate Institute of New Zealand property management code of practice which according to the REAA outlines industry best practices for dealing with the public. Critics state the Real Estate Agents Authority complaint committee as having less scope or jurisdiction for adverse judgement against negligent Property Management licences as they would otherwise to those in "real estate agency work", unsatisfactory property management conduct cases can receive findings of "no further action" as opposed to "unsatisfactory conduct" due to "conduct unrelated to estate agency work". Best practice guidelines imply Licensed Real Estate agencies conducting property management business should collect rent through an audited trust account which brings some certainty to the security of the Landlord and Tenants rental Monies though REAA cases implies that this is not always so.

The Residential Tenancies Act 1986 sets out the rights and responsibilities of residential landlords and tenants, including the requirement to have a written tenancy agreement and the need to lodge tenancy bonds (if one is required) with the Ministry of Business, Innovation and Employment. The Tenancy Tribunal and its adjudicators/mediators hear and make judgement on disputes (between landlord and tenants) in relation to any breaches of The Residential Tenancies Act 1986 and The Unit Titles Act 2010.

On July 1 2019, the Healthy Homes Standards became law. The healthy homes standards introduce specific and minimum standards for heating, insulation, ventilation, moisture ingress and drainage, and draught stopping in rental properties. All private rentals must comply within 90 days of any new or renewed tenancy after 1 July 2021, with all private rentals complying by 1 July 2024

The Unit Titles Act 2010 sets out the law for the ownership and management of unit title developments, where multiple owners each hold a unit title. The Act covers the set-up of such developments, body corporate governance, the rights and obligations of the body corporate and unit owners, disclosure between buyers and sellers, dispute resolution etc. The Unit Titles Regulations 2011 provide operational guidelines. The body corporate is responsible for financial and administrative functions relating to the common property and the development. All unit owners are members of the body corporate. A body corporate can delegate some of its powers and duties to a body corporate committee and a professional body corporate manager may be contracted to provide services.

Republic of Ireland 
In the Republic of Ireland, there is no legal obligation to form a property management company. However, management companies are generally formed to manage multi-unit developments, and must then follow the general rules of company law in terms of ownership and administration.

Since July 2012, it has become mandatory for all property service providers, including property management companies, to be registered and fully licensed by the Property Services Regulatory Authority of Ireland.

The National Consumer Agency (NCA) has campaigned in this area, and in September 2008 it launched a website explaining consumer rights. The NCA does not have a legislative or regulatory function in the area, unless a consumer complaint is in relation to a breach of consumer law.

Romania 
No specific regulatory or licensing body exists at this time (November 2012). However, under financial business law, Any business offering Property Management as a chargeable, fee earning act of commerce may only do so if such services are listed in their Company Acts of Constitutions, i.e., legally pre-declared list of business activities. Under Romanian law, no business can derive income from any such service that is not declared in this way and should be demonstrable upon request by the client of legal entities.

United Kingdom 
In the United Kingdom, there is no statutory regulation concerning property management companies. Companies that manage rented residential property are often members of the Association of Residential Letting Agents. Companies or individual landlords who accept tenancy deposits for "assured shorthold tenancies" (the usual form of residential tenancy) are required by statute to be members of a Tenancy Deposit Scheme.

United States 
Most states, such as New York, and Colorado, require property management companies to be licensed real estate brokers if they are collecting rent, listing properties for rent, or helping negotiate leases and doing inspections as a third-party. A property manager may be a licensed real estate salesperson but generally they must be working under a licensed real estate broker. Most states have a public license check system online for anyone holding a real estate salesperson or real estate broker's license. A few states, such as Idaho, Maine, and Vermont do not require property managers to have real estate licenses. Other states, such as Montana, Oregon, and South Carolina, allow property managers to work under a property management license rather than a broker's license. Some states, like Pennsylvania, allow property managers to work without a real estate license if they do not negotiate leases, hold tenants' money, or enter into leases on the property owner's behalf.

Owners who manage their own property are not required to have a real estate license in many states; however, they must at least have a business license to rent out their own home. Owners who do not live near the rental property may be required, by local government, to hire the services of a property management company. Some states with high tourism numbers, such as Hawaii, have strict property management rules.

In California, third-party apartment property managers must be licensed with the California Bureau of Real Estate as a Real Estate Broker. A broker's license is required for any person or company that, for compensation, leases or rents or offers to lease or rent, or places for rent, or solicits listing of places for rent, or solicits for prospective tenants, or negotiates the sale, purchase or exchanges of leases on real property, or on a business opportunity, or collects rents from real property, or improvements thereon, or from business opportunities. California Code of Regulations, Title 25, section 42, requires property owners of apartment buildings with 16 or more units to have on-site resident managers living on their properties. There is no such requirement for apartment buildings with less than 16 units.

The designation Real Estate Broker is often confused by those unfamiliar with terms of the industry as Realtor, Agent, or Salesperson.

Panama 

In order to be able to manage properties in Panama, at that moment, no licenses are required, as long as the company is focused on managing properties. Nevertheless, a real estate company which plans to buy and sell properties requires a license.

Kenya 
In Kenya the Estate Agents Registration Board (EARB) is the regulatory body for estate agency practice in Kenya and it derives its mandate from Estate Agents Act, 1984 Cap 533 which was operationalized in 1987. As per the provisions of the Act, the Board is charged with the responsibility of registering estate agents and ensuring that the competence and conduct of practicing estate agents are of a standard sufficiently high to ensure the protection of the public. The Board also keeps a list of registered members on its website that is accessible to members of public, In accordance with section 9 of the Estate Agents Act. The Board recently drafted a proposal with a set of amendments to the Estate Agents Act.

Associations that real estate agents and property developers can join include: Kenya Property Developers Association (KPDA) KPDA was established in Nairobi in 2006 as the representative body of the residential, commercial and industrial property development sector in Kenya. It is an emerging Business Member Organisation which works in proactive partnership with policy-makers, financiers and citizens to ensure that the property development industry grows rapidly but in an organized, efficient, economical and ethical manner. Another Association is the Kenya Professional Realtors Association (KPRA). KPRA is a professional organization that advances Real Estate Professional Services for Real Estate Professionals who buy, sell and manage real estate and related businesses. KPRA Provides a variety of services to its members including professional designation, training certification, education and legislative representation, as well as membership in local and regional businesses affiliated with KPRA.

Professional designations 

Building Owners and Managers Association (BOMA International) offers industry-standard designations that certify the training to property managers:
 Real Property Administrator (RPA)
 Facilities Management Administrator (FMA)
 Systems Maintenance Administrator (SMA)
 Systems Maintenance Technician (SMT)

Institute of Real Estate Management (IREM)
 Certified Property Manager (CPM)
 Accredited Residential Manager (ARM)
 Accredited Commercial Manager (ACoM)
 Accredited Management Organization (AMO)

Manufactured Housing Institute (MHI)
 Accredited Community Manager (ACM)
 Professional Housing Consultant (PHC)

National Apartment Association (NAA) has the following designations:
 Certified Apartment Manager (CAM)
 Certified Apartment Property Supervisor (CAPS)
 Certificate for Apartment Maintenance Technicians (CAMT)
 National Apartment Leasing Professional (NALP)

National Association of Residential Property Managers (NARPM) offers designations to certify ethical and professional standards of conduct for property managers:
 Residential Management Professional (RMP)
 Master Property Manager (MPM)
 Certified Support Specialist (CSS)
 Certified Residential Management Company (CRMC)
 Certified Maintenance Coordinator (CMC)
 Certified Residential Management Bookkeeper (CRMB)

State-specific designations include the following:
 California – Certified Community Association Manager (CCAM)
 Florida – Community Association Manager (CAM)
 Minnesota – Certified Community Association Manager (CCAM)
 Minnesota – Certified Residential Manager (CRM)

The Community Associations Institute also has designations in the United States for residential property managers who manage planned communities such as Condominiums, Home Owners Associations and Cooperatives. National designations include:
 Association Management Specialist (AMS)
 Certified Manager of Community Associations (CMCA)
 Large Scale Manager (LSM)
 Professional Community Association Manager (PCAM) – Highest designation awarded.

The National Association of Home Builders has a specialized designation for the affordable housing industry through the Low Income Housing Tax Credit (LIHTC) program:
• Housing Credit Certified Professional (HCCP)

In the UK:
 Association of Residential Managing Agents (ARMA)
 Institute of Residential Property Management (IRPM)

In Kenya:
 Estate Agents Registration Board (EARB)
 Kenya Property Developers Association (KPDA)
 Kenya Professional Realtors Association (KPRA)

Property management software 
Property management software continues to grow in popularity and importance. As it decreases in price, smaller companies and amateur property managers can function using some of the same best practices and efficiency as larger companies. Online asset management software (OPMS, or online property management software) has been a significant cause of the price declines. In addition to the core property management software options, a quickly growing number of closely related software products are being introduced to the industry.

A property management system, also known as a PMS, is a comprehensive software application used to cover objectives like coordinating the operational functions of the front office, bookings, communication with guests, planning, reporting, etc. This kind of software is used to run large-scale hotels and vacation properties.

Business models

Percentage of rent 
This is the most common model, and is used by property management companies in the residential space that manage multi-home units and single family homes. The property owner in this case signs a property management agreement with the company, giving the latter the right to let it out to new tenants and collect rent. The owners don't usually even know who the tenants are. The property management company usually keeps 10-15% of the rent amount, and shares the rest with the property owner.

Fixed fee 
This is the most common revenue model used by companies when monitoring empty homes or empty land sites. The work here involves monitoring the property and ensuring that it is safe and secure, and reporting back to the owner. As there is no income from these properties, a fixed monthly fee is usually charged to the owner.

Guaranteed rent 
This model is also used in the residential space, but mostly for small units in high demand locations. Here, the company signs a rental agreement with the owner and pays them a fixed rent. As per the agreement, the company is given the right to sublet the property for a higher rent. The company's income is the difference between the two rents. As is evident, in this case, the company minimizes the rent paid to the owner, which is usually lower than market rates.

Revenue share 
This model applies to the service apartment space and other commercial establishments, such as retail or business centers that generate revenue. In this case, the property manager signs an agreement with the property owner, with the right to convert the property into a revenue generating business such as a business center, service apartment, etc. Instead of paying rent to the owner, the management company shares a percentage of revenue. There are also hybrid structures here, where a combination of a fixed rent and a share of revenue is shared with the property owner.

See also 
 1:5:200
 Access control
 Activity relationship chart
 Building information modeling
 Building management
 Computerized maintenance management system
 Enterprise asset management
 Facility management
 Lease administration
 Physical plant
 Property maintenance
 Property management business models
 Property manager
 Security guard

References 

 
Management by type